Rosanne Santos Ada (June 28, 1944 – March 18, 2021) was a Guamanian businesswoman who served as the First Lady of Guam from 1987 to 1995.

Early life 
On June 28, 1944 Ada was born as Rosanne Jacqueline Santos in Guam during the Japanese occupation of Guam. Ada was born as her parents and siblings marched enroute to Manenggon Concentration Camp. Ada's father was Mariano Barcinas Santos. Ada's mother was Ana Sablan Borja Santos. Ada had seven siblings. The Japanese occupation of Guam ended on August 10, 1944. Ada graduated from George Washington High School.

Education 
In 1967, Ada earned a Bachelor's degree in Elementary and Special Education from University of Arizona. Ada earned a Master's degree in Education from University of Portland, a Catholic university in Oregon.

Career 
Ada was an advocate of people with disabilities. Ada was a former executive director of the Guam Developmental Disabilities Council.

In November 1986, when Joseph Franklin Ada won the election as the Governor of Guam, Ada became the First Lady of Guam. Ada served as First Lady of Guam on January 5, 1987, until January 2, 1995.

Personal life 
Ada's husband was Joseph Franklin Ada. They have three children, Eric, Tricia, and Esther.

In March 18, 2021, Ada died in her home in Yigo, Guam. Ada is interred at Guam Memorial Park in Leyang, Barrigada, Guam.

References

External links 
 Guam mourns death of former first lady Rosanne Ada at pacificislandtimes.com
 Tributes pour in for former first lady, advocate for people with disabilities at postguam.com

1944 births
2021 deaths
Chamorro people
First Ladies and Gentlemen of Guam
Guamanian Republicans
21st-century American women